The Tour de France Femmes is an annual women's cycle stage race around France. It is organised by Amaury Sport Organization (ASO), which also runs the Tour de France. It is part of the UCI Women's World Tour.

Some teams and media have referred to the race as a 'Grand Tour', as it is one of the biggest events on the women's calendar. However, the race does not meet the UCI definition of such an event.

After a one off event in 1955, an equivalent race to the Tour de France for women was held under different names between 1984 and 2009. Over the years, these races struggled with financial difficulties, limited media coverage and trademark issues with the organisers of the Tour de France. Following criticism by campaigners and the professional women's peloton, a one/two day race (La Course by Le Tour de France) was held between 2014 and 2021, and Tour de France Femmes staged its first edition in 2022.

The 2022 edition of the race featured 8 stages, taking place in July in the week after the men's tour. 24 teams took part, with six riders in each team.

All stages are timed to the finish; the riders' times are compounded with their previous stage times. The rider with the lowest cumulative finishing times is the leader of the race and wears the yellow jersey (maillot jaune). While the general classification garners the most attention, there are other contests held within the Tour: the points classification for the sprinters, the mountains classification for the climbers, young rider classification for riders under the age of 23, and the team classification, based on the first three finishers from each team on each stage. Achieving a stage win also provides prestige, often accomplished by a team's sprint specialist or a rider taking part in a breakaway.

Historic French races 

Various professional women's cycle stage races across France have been held as an equivalent to the Tour de France for women, with the first of these races staged as a one off in 1955. From 1984, a women's Tour de France was staged consistently, although the name of the event changed several times - such as Tour de France Féminin, Tour of the EEC Women, Tour Cycliste Féminin and Grande Boucle Féminine Internationale.

Over the years, these races struggled with financial difficulties, limited media coverage and trademark issues with the organisers Amaury Sport Organisation (the organisers of the Tour de France). The last of these races took place in 2009, with Emma Pooley joking that the race was "more of a Petite Boucle than Grande."

La Course by Le Tour de France 

In 2013, professional cyclists Kathryn Bertine, Marianne Vos and Emma Pooley and professional triathlete Chrissie Wellington formed an activist group called Le Tour Entier (“the whole tour”), to petition ASO to launch a women's Tour de France.

Following substantial media coverage, and a petition signed by over 100,000 people, ASO launched La Course by Tour de France in 2014. This race would be held in conjunction with the Tour de France, with the first edition taking place as a one-day race on the Champs-Élysées in advance of the final stage of the men's race. In subsequent years, the race took place in a variety of locations such as Pau, Col de la Colombière and Col d'Izoard in conjunction with the men's race, as the ASO argued that this was the "best way to shine a light on female cycling".

The race was initially praised for the exposure gained by 'sharing the stage' with the Tour de France, however La Course was criticised for not being a "full Tour de France", being overshadowed by the men's race and not having a challenging enough parcours. ASO were also criticised for not doing enough to promote the race. ASO stated that logistical issues mean that a men's and women's Tour de France would not be able to be staged simultaneously, and that any race must be financially sustainable.

Tour de France Femmes 

In June 2021, ASO announced that they would launch a new women's stage race, Tour de France Femmes. The first edition would take place over 8 days, following the 2022 Tour de France in July 2022. ASO also announced that Zwift would sponsor the race, with live television coverage provided by France Télévisions in conjunction with the European Broadcasting Union. The men's tour director, Christian Prudhomme stated that lessons must be learned from the failure of previous events like the Grande Boucle Féminine Internationale, and the goal of ASO is to have a financially sustainable event, one "that will still exist in 100 years".

The reaction to the launch of the event from the professional women's peloton was overwhelmingly positive, with Anna van der Breggen stating that it has "long been a dream for many of us to compete in a women's Tour de France" and Cecilie Uttrup Ludwig stating that "this is a day that we’ve waited for, for a long time".

The race has identical classifications to the Tour de France, with the yellow jersey for the general classification, the green jersey for the points classification, the polka dot jersey for the mountains classification, and the white jersey for the young rider (under 23) classification. The jerseys are made by Santini. Main sponsor Zwift have stated that the success of the women's 'virtual Tour de France' during the COVID-19 pandemic encouraged them to commit to sponsoring the race, with other major Tour de France sponsors like LCL, E.Leclerc and Škoda also supporting the event. The race has a prize fund of €250,000, making it the richest race in women's cycling.

2022 edition 
In October 2021, the route of the 2022 edition was announced by race director Marion Rousse. The race started in Paris, with a stage finishing the Champs-Élysées on the morning of the final day of the men's race. The 8 day race culminated in a summit finish at La Planche des Belles Filles.

The first edition of the race took place in July 2022, with Annemiek van Vleuten winning the week long race by nearly 4 minutes, despite suffering from a stomach bug in the early stages of the race. Marianne Vos took the green jersey of the points classification and Demi Vollering took the polka dot jersey of the mountain classification, as well as finishing second overall. The race was highly praised by the public, media, teams and riders - with large crowds and high TV viewership. As the first official women's Tour de France since 1989, the race enjoyed substantial media coverage around the world. Race director Marion Rousse did note that there was room for improvement in future editions, and in women's cycling more generally.

2023 edition 
The route of the 2023 edition was announced in October 2022 to praise from riders. The race will start in Clermont-Ferrand on the day that the 2023 Tour de France finishes, before heading south across the Massif Central towards the Pyrenees. The final stage will be a individual time trial in Pau.

Winners

See also
 Giro d'Italia Femminile - a stage race in Italy
 La Vuelta Femenina - a stage race in Spain in 2023

References

External links

Cycle races in France
Women's road bicycle races
 Femmes
Recurring sporting events established in 2022
2022 establishments in France
UCI Women's World Tour races